Vosges Haut-Chocolat is a Chicago-based luxury chocolate maker, founded in 1998, that offers varieties flavored with spices, bacon, and other ingredients. It is owned by Katrina Markoff, who also created the Wild Ophelia brand to offer natural non-GMO Americana chocolates. 
The company produces many odd flavor combinations, including Red Fire Chocolat, made with Mexican chilis, cinnamon and dark chocolate, Black Pearl Chocolat made with ginger, black sesame seeds and dark chocolate, and Mo's Milk Chocolate Bacon Bar.''''  A novelty at the time, it started a trend.

The company features different gourmet chocolates at their Chicago boutiques.

Vosges offers flavors including Red Fire Toffee, Red Fire Spice, and a Oaxaca blend. Huffington Post's reviewers also gave the chocolates high marks, noting the unusual offerings, such as Wild Tuscan Fennel Pollen, with Floral Anise, and Ginger plus Fresh Wasabi, with Black Sesame Seeds.

Further reading
 Fortune Zoom: Surprising Ways to Supercharge Your Career by Leigh Gallagher and Daniel Roberts, TI Incorporated Books (2013)
 Look at More: A Proven Approach to Innovation, Growth, and Change by Andy Stefanovich, Wiley (2011)
 Cooking Up a Business: Lessons from Food Lovers who Turned Their Passion Into a Career--and how You Can, Too'' by Rachel Hofstetter, Perigree Books (2013)

References 

American chocolate companies
Luxury brands